The Continental Divide tree frog (Isthmohyla graceae)  is a species of frog in the family Hylidae found in Panama and possibly Costa Rica. Its natural habitats are subtropical or tropical moist montane forests, rivers, freshwater marshes, and intermittent freshwater marshes.
It is threatened by habitat loss.

References

Sources

Isthmohyla
Amphibians described in 1982
Taxonomy articles created by Polbot